East Coast Radio may refer to:
 East Coast Radio (Australia)
 East Coast Radio (Ireland)
 East Coast Radio (South Africa)